This is a list of equipment used by the Salvadoran Army.

Firearms 

 
 RPG-7
 M40 recoilless rifle
 M67 recoilless rifle – 379
 M72A2 LAW – 792
 C90-CR (M3)
 M18 smoke grenade
 M67 grenade

Vehicles 
Note: Sources are circa 1988, while some equipment listed may no longer be in service.

Artillery

References 

Military of El Salvador
Salvador